The Church of Assumption of Our Lady, Căuşeni is a historical monument in Căuşeni, Moldova.

The church was painted in 1763 by Stanciul Radu şi Voicul.

Gallery

Bibliography 
Constantin Ciobanu - Biserica Adormirea Maicii Domnului din Căuşeni, Editura Ştiinţa, Chişinău, 1997;  
Pavel Balan, Icoana Sufletului Nostru, Ed. Hyperion, Chişinău, 1992.

References

External links 

 Biserici din Moldova - Biserica "Adormirea Maicii Domnului" din Căuşeni  - proiectul Moldova lui Ştefan

17th-century churches
Religious buildings and structures in Moldova
Churches in Moldova